Casais may refer to the following places in Portugal:

 Casais (Lousada), a parish in the municipality of Lousada
 Casais (Tomar), a parish in the municipality of Tomar
 Casais do Douro